Yaiza is a municipality on the island of Lanzarote in the Canary Islands, Spain. It lies in the southwest of the island and forms part of the province of Las Palmas. The municipality is bounded by the Atlantic Ocean to the west, south and east. To the north, the Timanfaya National Park is partly within the municipality. The eastern part of the municipality is mountainous and, south west of the mountains, the Rubicon plain stretches to the coast.

At the southern end of the municipality of Yaiza, in the area known as "El Rubicón", the first European settlement in the Canary Islands in 1402, where the conquest of the Archipelago began he was installed. In this place there existed the Cathedral of Saint Martial of Limoges. This cathedral was destroyed by English pirates in the sixteenth century and is currently in Femés, the Hermitage of Saint Martial of Limoges dedicated to this saint. This diocese was moved in 1483 to Las Palmas de Gran Canaria (Roman Catholic Diocese of Canarias).

The largest town of the municipality is Playa Blanca on the south coast. The administrative centre is the much smaller town of Yaiza.

History 
At the southern end of the municipality of Yaiza, in the area known as "El Rubicón", the first European settlement of the Canary Islands was established in 1402, from where the Conquest of the Archipelago began. In that place was the Cathedral of San Marcial de Limoges, patron saint of Lanzarote and compatron of the Canarian Diocese.1 This cathedral was destroyed by English pirates in the sixteenth century and is currently located in Femés, the Chapel of San Marcial de Limoges dedicated to this saint.

Yaiza is on the edge of the area buried by the volcanic eruptions that took place in Lanzarote between 1730 and 1736, which gave rise to the Timanfaya National Park. Precisely, the fundamental chronicle of the eruptions was narrated by the then parish priest of Yaiza, Andrés Lorenzo Curbelo.

Sites of interest 
 El Golfo
 Charco de los Clicos
 Los Hervideros
 Playa Blanca, beach town located in the south of the island
 Papagayo beaches
 Hacha Grande, mountain
 Puerto Calero marina

Gallery

See also 
 List of municipalities in Las Palmas

References

External links 

  Official website

Municipalities in Lanzarote